Olakunle Olumide Dada-Luke (born January 12, 2000) is a Canadian professional soccer player who plays as a full-back for Pacific FC in the Canadian Premier League.

Early life 
Dada-Luke began playing youth soccer with West Toronto SC at age of three. After ten years with West Toronto, he joined the Toronto FC Academy in 2013. On March 15, 2017, he scored in a 1-1 draw at the Viareggio Cup against the Juventus academy team.

Club career 
From 2016 to 2018, he played with Toronto FC III in League1 Ontario. In 2018, he was named co-Young Player of the Year and was named to the league 2nd all-star team.

In 2018, he began playing for Toronto FC II in the USL, making five total appearances.

In July 2019, Dada-Luke joined Danish club FC Helsingør on a three-year contract after a successful trial. While at Helsingør, he converted from playing winger to becoming a defender at right-back. On January 14, 2020, they announced he had left the club, after not making any appearances.

In March 2020, he joined Atlético Ottawa in the Canadian Premier League . However, he was unable to travel to Prince Edward Island for the shortened 2020 season due to an ankle injury, and never appeared for the club as a result.

In March 2021, Dada-Luke signed with Pacific FC. He recorded two assists in his debut season and also caused the winning goal in the semi-final against Cavalry FC (which was ultimately ruled an own goal), en route to winning the CPL title that season. On September 3, 2022, he scored his first professional goal against York United FC, which helped him earn CPL Team of the Week honours for the second time that season. In January 2023, he re-signed with the club for another season, with an option for 2024.

International career 
In October 2014, he made his debut in the Canadian youth program at an identification camp for the Canada U15 team. He was named to the roster for the 2017 CONCACAF U-17 Championship, where he made two appearances.

Career statistics

Honours

Club
Pacific FC
Canadian Premier League: 2021

References

External links 
 

2000 births
Living people
Association football forwards
Canadian soccer players
Soccer players from Mississauga
Black Canadian soccer players
Canadian sportspeople of Nigerian descent
Canadian expatriate soccer players
Expatriate men's footballers in Denmark
Canadian expatriate sportspeople in Denmark
Toronto FC players
Toronto FC II players
FC Helsingør players
Atlético Ottawa players
Pacific FC players
League1 Ontario players
USL Championship players
Canadian Premier League players